Rubén-Darío Torres (born 23 February 1981) is a Colombian former professional tennis player.

A native of Cali, Torres represented Colombia in a 2000 Davis Cup tie against Ecuador in Bogotá. While competing on the professional tour he attained best rankings of 627 for singles and 549 for doubles, with his three ITF Futures titles won in doubles. He was also a collegiate tennis player for the University of Southern California (USC Trojans), featuring in the 2002 NCAA Division I championship team.

Torres was in a relationship with Hollywood actress Hilary Swank from 2015 to 2016 and the pair were briefly engaged. He now works as a financial advisor in Los Angeles.

ITF Futures titles

Doubles: (3)

References

External links
 
 
 

1981 births
Living people
Colombian male tennis players
USC Trojans men's tennis players
Sportspeople from Cali